is a Japanese professional wrestler, currently working for the Japanese professional wrestling promotion DDT Pro-Wrestling (DDT) under the ring name .

Professional wrestling career

Independent circuit (2017-present)
Iino participated in DDT/Sendai Girls All Out X Sendai Girls Pro Wrestling, a cross-over event produced and promoted by both Dramatic Dream Team and Sendai Girls' Pro Wrestling on June 24, 2019, where he teamed up with fellow All Out stable members Konosuke Takeshita and Shunma Katsumata to win the KO-D 6-Man Tag Team Championship from Chihiro Hashimoto, Dash Chisako and Meiko Satomura.

DDT Pro Wrestling (2017-present)
Iino made his professional wrestling debut at Ryōgoku Peter Pan 2017, an event produced by Dramatic Dream Team on August 20, where he teamed up with Kouki Iwasaki, falling short to Yuki Ueno and Naomi Yoshimura. At DDT Summer Vacation 2018 on July 22, he participated in a tag team scramble rumble for the Uchikomi! Openweight Ultimate Championship, where he teamed up with Super Sasadango Machine and competed against the winner Ken Ohka, Gota Ihashi and Kudo, Danshoku Dino and Makoto Oishi and others.

At the final round of King Of DDT 2018 on August 26, Iino teamed up with Akito as All Out alongside Gorgeous Matsuno and Saki Akai, falling short to T2Hii (Kazuki Hirata, Sanshiro Takagi and Toru Owashi) in a 4-on-3 handicap lucha rules match. At DDT D-Oh Grand Prix 2019 In Shinjuku  on November 30, Iino teamed up again with his All Out stable partner Akito, Antonio Honda, Gorgeous Matsuno and Makoto Oishi to defeat #StrongHearts (Cima, Dezmond Xavier, El Lindaman, Trey Miguel and Zachary Wentz) in a ten-man tag team match.

At DDT Live! Maji Manji Super - New Year Special! on January 3, 2019, Iino teamed up with fellow All Out stable members Konosuke Takeshita and Akito to win the KO-D 6-Man Tag Team Championship by defeating Strong Hearts (Cima, Duan Yingnan and T-Hawk). At DDT Sweet Dreams 2019 on January 27, Iino competed for the Ironman Heavymetalweight Championship in a 8-man battle royal also involving the winner Asuka, Chinsuke Nakamura, Kazuki Hirata, Kazusada Higuchi, Keisuke Okuda, Kikutaro and Toru Owashi. At Judgement 2019: DDT 22nd Anniversary on February 17, 2019, Iino teamed up with Daisuke Sekimoto and Toru Owashi falling short to Yukio Naya, Go Shiozaki and Kazusada Higuchi At Into The Fight 2019 on March 21, he teamed up with Akito and Konosuke Takeshita to lose the KO-D 6-Man Tag Team Championship to Sendai Girls' Pro Wrestling ((Chihiro Hashimoto, Dash Chisako and Meiko Satomura). At DDT God Bless DDT 2019 on November 24, Iino unsuccessfully challenged Harashima for the KO-D Openweight Championship following a no.1 contendership match which he win weeks ago.

At DDT Sweet Dreams! 2020 on January 26, Iino teamed up with Chihiro Hashimoto to unsuccessfully challenge Nautilus (Naomi Yoshimura and Yuki Ueno) for the KO-D Tag Team Championship in an intergender tag team match. At Judgement 2021: DDT 24th Anniversary on March 28, he teamed up with Yusuke Okada in a losing effort to Chris Brookes and Toui Kojima.

In August 2021, Iino changed his ring name to Yuki "Sexy" Iino when he formed a tag team called Pheromones with Danshoku "Dandy" Dino.

Championships and accomplishments
DDT Pro-Wrestling
DDT Extreme Championship (1 time, current)
KO-D 6-Man Tag Team Championship (3 times, current) – with Konosuke Takeshita and Akito (1), Konosuke Takeshita and Shunma Katsumata (1), and Danshoku "Dandy" Dino and Yumehito "Fantastic" Imanari (1)
KO-D 8-Man Tag Team Championship (1 time) – with Danshoku Dino, Asuka, Mizuki and Trans-Am★HiroshiJapan Indie Awards'''
Best Unit Award (2021) – with Danshoku "Dandy" Dino and Yumehito "Fantastic" Himanari

References 

1994 births
Living people
Japanese male professional wrestlers
21st-century professional wrestlers
DDT Extreme Champions
KO-D 6-Man Tag Team Champions
KO-D 8-Man/10-Man Tag Team Champions